A list of films produced in Egypt in 1954. For an A-Z list of films currently on Wikipedia, see :Category:Egyptian films.

External links
 Egyptian films of 1954 at the Internet Movie Database
 Egyptian films of 1954 elCinema.com

Lists of Egyptian films by year
1954 in Egypt
Lists of 1954 films by country or language